Parliamentary elections were held in Laos on 18 July 1965 to elect members of the National Assembly, the lower chamber of Parliament. The elections were boycotted by the Lao Patriotic Front, and saw the Southern Bloc emerge as the largest party with 15 of the 59 seats. However, only 22,000 citizens were allowed to vote, with the franchise restricted to politicians, civil servants, army officers, police and local government officers.

Results

References

Laos
Elections in Laos
1965 in Laos
Election and referendum articles with incomplete results